BarCamp is an international network of user-generated conferences primarily focused around technology and the web. They are open, participatory workshop-events, the content of which is provided by participants.  The first BarCamps focused on early-stage web applications, and were related to open source technologies, social software, and open data formats.

The format has also been used for a variety of other topics, including public transit, health care, education, and political organizing. The BarCamp format has also been adapted for specific industries like banking, education, real estate and social media.

History

The name BarCamp is a playful allusion to the event's origins, with reference to the programmer slang term, foobar: BarCamp arose as an open-to-the-public alternative to Foo Camp, which is an annual invitation-only participant-driven conference hosted by Tim O'Reilly.

The first BarCamp was held in Palo Alto, California, from August 19–21, 2005, in the offices of Socialtext. It was organized in less than one week, from concept to event, with 200 attendees.

Since then, BarCamps have been held in over 350 cities around the world, in North America, South America, Africa, Europe, the Middle East, Australasia and Asia. Attendees have often travelled internationally to attend BarCamps.

To mark the first anniversary of BarCamp, BarCampEarth was held in multiple locations worldwide on August 25–27, 2006. The second anniversary of BarCamp, BarCampBlock, was held in Palo Alto at the original location, but also over a three block radius on August 18–19, 2007, and was attended by over 800 people.

The largest recorded BarCamp took place in January 2013 with over 6400 confirmed registered attendees in Yangon, Myanmar (Burma). The January 2010 BarCamp Yangon attracted over 4700 attendees (confirmed with registration forms).

Influence
BarCamp makes their organizational process freely available, codifying it in a publicly available wiki. In addition to the BarCamp-branded network, it is also a model for user-generated conferences in other fields and for more specialized applications such as EdCamp, IndieWebCamp, WordCamp, crisis camps, and SkeptiCamp.

Structure and participatory process
Unlike traditional conference formats, both BarCamps and FooCamps have a self-organizing character, relying on the passion and the responsibility of the participants. Attendees schedule sessions by writing on a whiteboard or putting a Post-It note on a 'grid' of sessions. Those giving sessions are discouraged from using the sessions for promotion. BarCamps are often organized largely through the web; anyone can initiate a BarCamp using the BarCamp wiki.

Although the format is loosely structured, there are rules at BarCamp. All attendees are encouraged to present or facilitate a session or otherwise contribute to the event. Everyone is also asked to share information and experiences of the event via public web channels, including blogs, photo sharing, social bookmarking, Twitter, wikis, and IRC. This encouragement to share is a deliberate change from the "off-the-record by default" and "no recordings" rules at many invite-only participant driven conferences. It also turns a physical, face-to-face event into a 'hybrid event' which enables remote online engagement with BarCamp participants.

Hosting and attending
Venues typically provide basic services. Free network access, usually WiFi, is crucial. Following the model of Foo Camp, the venue also makes space for the attendees, or BarCampers, to literally camp out overnight. Thus, BarCamps rely on securing sponsorship, ranging from the venue and network access to beverages and food.

Attendance is typically free of charge and generally restricted only by space constraints. Participants are typically encouraged to sign up in advance.

Historical precedents
Historically, Bar Camp was based on the structure of Foo Camp, but with the requirement that participation should be open to all. (Foo Camp, an early unconference, was organized by Tim O'Reilly and Sara Winge; Winge had been a student of Harrison Owen.

This form of self-organized user generated conferences is also related to hackers' meetings in Europe, especially those nearer to anarchism and autonomism, happening since the '90s in Temporary Autonomous Zones or other occupied places. However, BarCamps lack the political motivations and are actually quite integrated with the mainstream ICT industry, often getting substantial sponsorships from major corporations.

See also
 Café Philosophique
 Hackathon
 Knowledge cafe
 StixCamp
 SuperHappyDevHouse
Sweden Social Web Camp
 TeachMeet
 Tribe (internet)
 DataMeet

References

External links

 BarCamp.org (website) (archived 2 November 2010)
 
 Singel, Ryan. Barring None, Geek Camp Rocks (archived 3 December 2005). Wired News. August 23, 2005. Retrieved June 30, 2006.
 Craig, Kathleen. Why "unconferences" are fun conferences. Business 2.0 Magazine.  June 6, 2006. Retrieved June 30, 2006.
 Murali, J. New conferencing tool: An attempt to conduct on-line meetings in a participatory environment (archived 22 April 2006). The Hindu. April 17, 2006. Retrieved June 30, 2006.
 Jagadeesh, Namith. With focus on human interaction, "unconferences" come of age. "LiveMint". May 26, 2008. Retrieved May 26, 2008.
 Tarun Chandel. Bridging the gap between students and industry. "LiveMint". March 8, 2008. Retrieved Mar 8, 2008.

 Çelik, Tantek. Remembering the idea of BarCamp, Tantek's Thoughts. July 10, 2006. Retrieved July 14, 2006.
 Messina, Chris. Bar camp buzz builds; the story twists, turns, shouts! FactoryCity (weblog). August 18, 2005. Retrieved June 30, 2006.
 Solaris, Julius A collection of resources to run a BarCamp. Event Manager Blog. January 31, 2008, Retrieved February 28, 2008.

Unconferences